Leonid Tcaci (born 16 May 1970) is a Moldavian professional football manager and former footballer. Since November 2014 he is the head coach of Moldavian football club FC Zaria Bălți.

References

External links
 Leonid Tcaci at soccerway (as manager)

1970 births
Living people
Moldovan footballers
Moldovan football managers
CSF Bălți managers
Association footballers not categorized by position
Moldovan Super Liga managers